Il Xerse ( in its 1660 French version Xerxès) is an opera by Francesco Cavalli (specifically, a dramma per musica) about Xerxes I. The libretto was written by Nicolò Minato, and was later set by both Giovanni Bononcini (1694, Xerse and George Frideric Handel (Serse, 1738). Minato's plot outline is loosely based on Book 7 of Herodotus's Histories. The opera, Cavalli's twenty-first, consisting of a prologue and three acts, was first performed at Venice on 12 January 1655, at the Teatro SS. Giovanni e Paolo. It was dedicated to the Ferrarese nobleman Marchese Cornelio Bentivoglio.

Background
The premiere at Venice was probably conducted by Cavalli from the keyboard. The opera was highly popular in Italy, not least due to Cavalli's setting of "Ombra mai fu" (later more famously set by Handel): nine different revivals were given across Italy while Cavalli lived.

In 1660 Cavalli was persuaded to travel to France to produce a new opera for the wedding of Louis XIV in Paris. He soon became entangled in court intrigue which ensured that the projected opera, Ercole amante, was not ready in time and had to be replaced by a revival of Xerse at the last minute. Xerse was given with ballets by Cavalli's rival Jean-Baptiste Lully, who had become the official court composer in France. The whole spectacle lasted eight or nine hours and the French audience had little appreciation for an opera in a foreign language, preferring Lully's dance music.

The opera was performed in many different versions. In its Paris form, apart from having the additional ballet suites, the plot was rewritten to make it more congenial to the court, including the enhancement of Xerse himself to a more kingly role comparable to the status of the King of France - which necessitated a change of the register of the part, originally written for a castrato, to a baritone. Many of the recitatives were also rewritten. Surviving manuscripts including Cavalli’s own annotations from performances of Xerse in Venice, Genoa, Naples and Bologna clearly demonstrate that he often amended, cut, and reorganized material as each production was being prepared.

Roles

Editions
Bärenreiter produced an edition of the 1660 version, edited by Barbara Nestola, in 2015 based on which the first staged performance in modern times was performed as part of the Festival della Valle d'Itria in Martina Franca in 2022, conducted by Federico Maria Sardelli and staged by Leo Muscato with the Italian countertenor Carlo Vistoli in the title role. A new edition of the original version was prepared by Marcio da Silva for a concert performance at the Cockpit Theatre, London in 2021.

Recording
Xerse  Judith Nelson, Isabelle Poulenard, Guy de Mey, Dominique Visse, Concerto Vocale, conducted by René Jacobs (4 CDs, Harmonia Mundi, 1985)

References

Sources

da Silva, Marcio (2021). Programme for Xerse, Cockpit Theatre, London (20 February 2021).

External links
 

Operas by Francesco Cavalli
Operas
1655 operas
Italian-language operas
Operas set in ancient Persia
Cultural depictions of Xerxes I